Hemidactylus acanthopholis is a species of house geckos from the Tirunelveli in southern Tamil Nadu.  Bearing a superficial resemblance to Hemidactylus maculatus, the species is usually found on large rocks or boulders.  Growing  in length, the species is an overall brown color, but has dark stripes on its back.  It takes its name from the warty protuberances running along its dorsal surface.

References

Hemidactylus
Reptiles of India
Fauna of Tamil Nadu
Endemic fauna of India
Reptiles described in 2014